Tunes is the third album by folk duo Spiers and Boden.

Track listing

Personnel
Jon Boden (vocals, fiddle)
John Spiers (vocals, melodeons, concertina).

Spiers and Boden albums
2005 albums